Blashenwell Farm Pit is an 11.4 hectare geological Site of Special Scientific Interest in Dorset, United Kingdom, notified in 1954. It is of scientific interest because the tufa at the site provides a detailed record of molluscan biostratigraphy and environmental history during the early- and mid-Flandrian interglacial.

Sources
 English Nature citation sheet for the site (accessed 31 August 2006)

External links
 English Nature website (SSSI information)

Isle of Purbeck
Sites of Special Scientific Interest in Dorset
Sites of Special Scientific Interest notified in 1954